Lemonia pauli is a species of moth of the family Brahmaeidae (older classifications placed it in Lemoniidae). It was described by Otto Staudinger in 1894. Its range includes Israel, Syria, Jordan and Lebanon.

References

Brahmaeidae
Moths described in 1894
Insects of Turkey